Old Tavern may refer to:

Old Tavern (Sacramento, California), listed on the National Register of Historic Places in Sacramento County, California
Old Tavern (Burlington, Maine), listed on the National Register of Historic Places in Penobscot County, Maine
 Old Tavern Farm

See also
Ye Olde Tavern (disambiguation)